Nurullah Sahaka (born 10 January 2000) is a Swiss figure skater. He is the 2018 Dragon Trophy champion, the 2017 FBMA Trophy silver medalist, and a four-time Swiss national medalist. He competed in the final segment at the 2018 World Junior Championships.

Career

Early years 
Sahaka began learning to skate in 2009. In January 2013, he became the Swiss national under-16 novice champion. He won silver in the junior men's category at the Swiss Championships in January 2014 and made his junior international debut the following month. He won the Swiss junior title in January 2015.

Sahaka debuted on the ISU Junior Grand Prix series in August 2015. He made his first appearance in the senior ranks and placed fifth at the Swiss Championships in December.

2016–2017 season 
In December 2016, Sahaka won his first senior national medal, bronze, having finished third behind Stéphane Walker and Lukas Britschgi. In January 2017, he won his first senior international medal – silver at the FBMA Trophy in Abu Dhabi. In March, he competed at the 2017 World Junior Championships in Taipei, Taiwan. Ranked 34th in the short program, he did not advance to the free skate.

2017–2018 season 
Sahaka began his season on the Junior Grand Prix series. He finished fourth in the senior ranks in December at the Swiss Championships. In February 2018, he won the senior men's title at the Dragon Trophy in Slovenia. In March, he qualified to the final segment at the 2018 World Junior Championships in Sofia, Bulgaria. He ranked 13th in the short program, 18th in the free skate, and 16th overall.

2018–2019 season 
In December, Sahaka won silver in the senior men's event at the Swiss Championships, placing second behind Britschgi. In March, he competed at the 2019 World Junior Championships in Zagreb, Croatia.

2019–2020 season 
Sahaka made his debut on the Challenger series, placing twelfth at the 2019 CS Nebelhorn Trophy and thirteenth at the 2019 CS Warsaw Cup.  In addition to competing at some minor internationals, he won another silver medal at the Swiss championships.

2020–2021 season 
With the COVID-19 pandemic greatly limiting international competitions, Sahaka's sole event of the year was the 2020 CS Nebelhorn Trophy, where he placed fifteenth.

2021–2022 season 
Sahaka made his debut at the 2021 CS Finlandia Trophy.

Programs

Competitive highlights 
CS: Challenger Series; JGP: Junior Grand Prix

References

External links 
 

2000 births
German emigrants to Switzerland
Living people
Sportspeople from Munich
Figure skaters from Zürich
Swiss male single skaters
Competitors at the 2023 Winter World University Games